Montealegre del Castillo is a municipality in Albacete, Castile-La Mancha, Spain. It has a population of 2,122 (2015).

Municipalities of the Province of Albacete